"Experiments on Plant Hybridization" (German: "Versuche über Pflanzen-Hybriden") is a seminal paper written in 1865 and published in 1866 by Gregor Mendel, an Augustinian friar considered to be the founder of modern genetics. The paper was the result after years spent studying genetic traits in Pisum sativum, the pea plant.

Content
In his paper, Mendel compared 7 pairs of discrete traits found in a pea plant:

Through experimentation, Mendel discovered that one inheritable trait would invariably be dominant to its recessive alternative. Mendel laid out the genetic model later known as Mendelian inheritance or Mendelian genetics. This model provided an alternative to blending inheritance, which was the prevailing theory at the time.

History
Mendel read his paper to the Natural History Society of Brünn. It was published in the Proceedings of the Natural History Society of Brünn the following year.

Mendel's work received little attention from the scientific community and was largely forgotten. It was not until the early 20th century that Mendel's work was rediscovered and his ideas used to help form the modern synthesis.

Analysis
In 1936, the statistician Ronald Fisher used a Pearson's chi-squared test to analyze Mendel's data and concluded that Mendel's results with the predicted ratios were far too perfect, suggesting that adjustments (intentional or unconscious) had been made to the data to make the observations fit the hypothesis. 

Later authors have suggested Fisher's analysis was flawed, proposing various statistical and botanical explanations for Mendel's numbers. It is also possible that Mendel's results are "too good" merely because he reported the best subset of his data—Mendel mentioned in his paper that the data were from a subset of his experiments.

References

 Gregor Mendel
Botanical literature
 1865 documents
 1866 documents
 1865 in biology
 1866 in biology